Megacerus discoidus is a species of pea or bean weevil in the family Chrysomelidae.  It is found in Central America and North America.

References

Bruchinae
Beetles described in 1824